Orvelte is a village in the Dutch province of Drenthe. It is a part of the municipality of Midden-Drenthe, and lies about 18 km northeast of Hoogeveen.

Orvelte presents itself as a museum village. There is a saw mill, a blacksmith and a wooden shoe maker, all open to the public. A number of events are held throughout the year featuring traditional Dutch activities.

History 
The village was first mentioned in 1362 as "in Oervelde", and probably means "other side of the (heath) field". Orvelte is an esdorp which developed in the Middle Ages on the road from Westerbork to Zweeloo. It may have been a daughter settlement of Westerbork.

The farm Bruntingerhof was built between 1560 and 1650, and is the oldest extant farm in Drenthe. It used to be located in the hamlet of Bruntinge, but was moved to Orvelte in the 1960s.

Orvelte was home to 140 people in 1840.

In 1967, the village was designated a protected site. It became a museum village and attempts were made to return the village to the layout of 1830. The brink (village square) has been restored and historical farms and barns from other villages which were scheduled to be demolished, have been purchased and moved to Orvelte. The former toll house was built around 1870 and is in use as a museum and tourist information site. Cars are no longer allowed in the village. A horse tram has been made available as public transport.

Gallery

References

External links 
 

Midden-Drenthe
Populated places in Drenthe